This article lists fellows of the Royal Society elected in 2001.

Fellows

David Ian Attwell
David Baulcombe
John Beddington
Tim Berners-Lee
Robert J. Birgeneau
J. Richard Bond
Hugh Bostock
Keith Burnett
Paul Callaghan
Graham Leon Collingridge
James F. Crow
Richard Clinton Dawkins
Roger Philip Ekins
Henry Elderfield
Anthony G. Evans
Brian Leonard Eyre
Peter Gluckman
Charles Godfray
Brigid L M Hogan
John David Hunt
Frances Kirwan
Shrinivas R Kulkarni
Andrew Greig William Leslie
Michael Levitt
Robin Lovell-Badge
Paul Anthony Madden
Patrick Moore (Honorary FRS)
Michael Stewart Paterson
Bruce Anthony John Ponder
Geoffrey Raisman
Allan Sandage
Dale Sanders
David William Schindler
George M. Sheldrick
Sheila Sherlock
Thomas James Simpson
Adrian Frederick Melhuish Smith
Mandyam Veerambudi Srinivasan
Ian Nicholas Stewart
Roger Ian Tanner
Marc Trevor Tessier-Lavigne
Nicholas Kester Tonks
William George Unruh
Bryan Ronald Webber
Alex James Wilkie

Foreign members

Alexei Alekseyevich Abrikosov
Alan Bicksler Fowler
Clara Franzini-Armstrong
Ahmed Hassan Zewail

References

2001
2001 in science
2001 in the United Kingdom